Injured Engine is a game released for the Apple II and Commodore 64 by Imagic. The player must diagnose problems in a simulated automobile engine. The game aims to teach how engines work and how engine parts relate to each other. It was created by an auto mechanic and a graphic artist. Imagic demonstrated it at the 1984 Consumer Electronics Show.

Gameplay

Reception 
Rhea J. Grundy of Home Computer Magazine compared it to a Revell V-8 engine model and said the game teaches an "increased awareness of your automobile" rather than the skill necessary to make repairs. Mark Cotone of Commodore Microcomputers wrote that Injured Engine will not replace mechanics or detailed manuals, but it can aid in learning proper maintenance. Joyce Worley of Electronic Games called it an easy game that can help novices to talk more knowledgeably to mechanics.  Kiplinger's Personal Finance called it an easy way to learn the basics of car engines.

References

External links 
 

1984 video games
Commodore 64 games
Apple II games
Puzzle video games
Children's educational video games
Multiplayer and single-player video games
Video games developed in the United States